Waiparahoaka Mountain is a mountain with elevation 3608 m, located SW of Mount Huggins in Victoria Land, Antarctica.
Waiparahoaka is a Maori name meaning "mountain of many glaciers".

Mountains of Victoria Land
Scott Coast